Paul Francis Anderson (April 20, 1917 – January 4, 1987) was an American prelate of the Roman Catholic Church. He served as Bishop of Duluth (1969–1982) and Auxiliary Bishop of Sioux Falls (1982–1987).

Biography
Paul Anderson was born in April 1917 in Roslindale, a neighborhood in Boston, Massachusetts, to Philip and Mary Elizabeth Anderson. His father lost his job during the 1919 Boston Police Strike and later became a motorman on the Boston Elevated Railway. After graduating from Winthrop High School in 1935, he enrolled at Boston College but soon transferred to St. John's Seminary in Brighton. He was ordained to the priesthood by Bishop Richard Cushing on January 6, 1943.

Anderson then served as a curate at Our Lady Comforter of the Afflicted Church in Waltham until 1946, when he accepted an invitation to join the Diocese of Sioux Falls in South Dakota. He served as a curate at Sacred Heart Church in Aberdeen, St. Martin Church in Huron, and Holy Cross Church in Ipswich. From 1947 to 1959, he was administrator of St. Catherine Church in Oldham. During his tenure in Oldham, he built a new church after the original structure was destroyed in a fire. He later served as pastor of St. Patrick Church in Montrose (1959–62), of St. Mary Church in Salem (1962–65), and of St. Martin in Huron (1965–69). During his pastoral work, he became active in the Christian Family Movement.

On July 19, 1968, Anderson was appointed Coadjutor Bishop of the Diocese of Duluth, Minnesota, and Titular Bishop of Polinianum by Pope Paul VI. He received his episcopal consecration on the following October 17 from Bishop Lambert Anthony Hoch, with Bishops Francis Joseph Schenk and Thomas Joseph Riley serving as co-consecrators. Upon the resignation of Bishop Schenk, Anderson succeeded him as the fifth Bishop of Duluth on April 30, 1969. During his 13-year tenure, he earned a reputation as an advocate for progressive causes, and worked to implement the reforms of the Second Vatican Council. He organized five regional pastoral councils, encouraged charismatic services, and improved Catholic relations with Protestants and Jews. He privately believed in the ordination of women, and appointed one of the first laywomen to serve on a diocesan matrimonial court.

On August 17, 1982, Anderson resigned as Bishop of Duluth; he was appointed the first auxiliary bishop of the Diocese of Sioux Falls by Pope John Paul II on the same date. As an auxiliary bishop, he served as diocesan Vicar for Spiritual Renewal. He died from complications following cancer surgery at St. Mary's Hospital in Rochester, at age 69.

References 

1917 births
1987 deaths
Clergy from Boston
Roman Catholic bishops of Duluth
20th-century Roman Catholic bishops in the United States
People from Roslindale